The River Arrow may mean:

The River Arrow, Wales (includes the Herefordshire, England, portion of the river)
The River Arrow, Worcestershire (includes the Warwickshire portion of the river)
River Arrow Nature Reserve, in Alcester, Warwickshire, England

See also
Arrow River (disambiguation)
Rivers of the United Kingdom
Arrow (disambiguation)
Arrow Creek (disambiguation)